Amsatou Sow Sidibé (born 1953) is an academic, lawyer and politician from Senegal. In 2012, she was the country's first female presidential candidate. Sidibé is a law professor at Cheikh Anta Diop University (University of Dakar), where she serves as director of the Institute for Human Rights and Peace. She also founded and has served as president of the African Network for the Promotion of African Women Workers (RAFET), based in Dakar.

In her various roles, Sidibé has diplomatically advocated for women's health, education and gender equality, helping to craft legislation around violence against women and to orchestrate Senegal's gender parity law in 2010, which requires political parties in local and national elections to have women for at least half of their candidates. Sidibé stated, "Women talk about parity everywhere, even in the bush," and has said, "They need to be at the highest level for decisions; that is important."

Sidibé attended Université Paris II, where she earned a doctorate in law and political science.

References

Senegalese women's rights activists
20th-century Senegalese lawyers
Senegalese women lawyers
Academic staff of Cheikh Anta Diop University
Paris 2 Panthéon-Assas University alumni
1953 births
Living people
21st-century Senegalese women politicians
21st-century Senegalese politicians
21st-century Senegalese lawyers